The 1993–94 season was Mansfield Town's 57th season in the Football League and 21st in the Third Division they finished in 12th position with 55 points.

Final league table

Results

Football League Third Division

FA Cup

League Cup

League Trophy

Squad statistics
 Squad list sourced from

References
General
 Mansfield Town 1993–94 at soccerbase.com (use drop down list to select relevant season)

Specific

Mansfield Town F.C. seasons
Mansfield Town